Bruce Peter Solomon is an American film and television actor, best known for the roles of Sgt. Foley in the TV show Mary Hartman, Mary Hartman and Kenny Zuckerman in Beverly Hills, 90210.

Television and film 
Solomon starred as the title character in the short-lived 1977 television series Lanigan's Rabbi, but is best known for his portrayal of Sgt. Foley on the TV show, Mary Hartman, Mary Hartman.  His acting teacher, Joan Darling, one of the directors for Mary Hartman, Mary Hartman, chose him for that role, despite the fact that it was originally written as an older, middle-aged policeman. When Solomon was cast in the role it was rewritten as a young, handsome, "ever-on-the-make" police officer.  He was also known for the role of Kenny Zuckerman in Beverly Hills, 90210.

In addition to his role of Rabbi David Small in Lanigan's Rabbi, he would also play a rabbi in the 2000 film, Harrison's Flowers.

Solomon was part of the cast of the comedy series E/R, which included Elliott Gould, Jason Alexander, and Mary McDonnell. His many guest star appearances in other series included Barney Miller and Resurrection Boulevard, and films including The Candidate and Foul Play.  One of his earliest movies was Children Shouldn't Play with Dead Things, in 1972. He was also in the 1986 TV movie, Maricela, about the daughter of an affluent American family who resents the daughter of the live-in maid from El Salvador. The TV drama was produced for public television's WonderWorks series.

In one of his most recent movie appearances, Solomon plays Edward Feldman, the Executive Producer of the television series Hogan's Heroes, in the 2002 film Auto Focus, the story of actor Bob Crane.  In that film, he has the well-known line to Crane, "Bob, don't try so hard. You're the hero of the show. It's named after you. Heroes don't try to be heroes. They simply are." Another of his famous lines—from the film Foul Play with Goldie Hawn—was "The dwarf...beware the dwarf."

Stage 
In addition to his roles in film and television, Solomon has appeared on stage in a number of plays in the Los Angeles area, including a number of productions of the Elephant Theatre Company.  Among the productions in which he has appeared were Search and Destroy, Dearboy's War, and Greystone.  And, after playing a rabbi on television and film, he originated the role of Catholic priest Fr. Carney in the Hollywood Stella Adler Theatre world premiere of the play Friends of Frank, the story of the decision to cast Marlon Brando in On The Waterfront rather than Frank Sinatra. The play was produced in 2005.

Filmography

Films

Television

References

External links
 

American male film actors
American male television actors
Living people
Male actors from New York City
20th-century American male actors
21st-century American male actors
Year of birth missing (living people)